Taningia is a genus of squid in the family Octopoteuthidae. For over 150 years, it has been believed to comprise a single species known as Taningia danae. Recently it has been shown to contain at least two new species (T. fimbria, T. rubea). Another species, Taningia persica, has historically been referred to but has been questioned. 

This genus is named after Danish fisheries biologist Åge Vedel Tåning (1890-1958).

References

External links

Tree of Life web project: Taningia

Squid
Cephalopod genera
Bioluminescent molluscs